Lonesome Dove: The Series is an American western drama television series that debuted in first-run syndication on September 26, 1994. It serves as continuation of the story of the miniseries of the same name. The television series starred Scott Bairstow and Eric McCormack, and its executive producers were Suzanne de Passe and Robert Halmi Jr. The series was produced by Telegenic Programs Inc. and RHI Entertainment in association with Rysher TPE, in conjunction with Canadian television network CTV.

In its second season which aired in syndication during the 1995–96 television season, the series was renamed Lonesome Dove: The Outlaw Years.

Plot 
In the series, Scott Bairstow plays the role of Newt Call (taking over the role played by Ricky Schroder in the original 1989 Lonesome Dove miniseries and its 1993 sequel Return to Lonesome Dove). The story follows Call as he leaves home to find adventure in Curtis Wells, Montana. He soon becomes attracted to Hannah (Christianne Hirt), the daughter of local newspaper publisher Josiah Peale (Paul Le Mat). Call also crosses paths with a stranger named Col. Francis Clay Mosby (Eric McCormack), who is revealed to be a former Confederate officer who's taken up a life of crime as his revenge against the Union.

Cast 
Season 1 refers to Lonesome Dove: The Series, while season 2 refers to Lonesome Dove: The Outlaw Years.

Main 

 Scott Bairstow as Newt Call
 Eric McCormack as Colonel Francis Clay Mosby
 Christianne Hirt as Hannah Peale (season 1)
 Kelly Rowan as Mattie Shaw (season 2)
 Paul Johansson as Austin Peale (recurring, season 1; main, season 2)
 Tracy Scoggins as Amanda (season 2)

Recurring 
 Paul Le Mat as Josiah Peele
 Diahann Carroll as Ida Grayson (season 1)
 Dennis Weaver as Bill "Buffalo Bill" Cody (season 1)
 Bret Hart as Luther Root (season 1)
 Frank C. Turner as Unbob Finch (season 2)

Production 
The series was filmed in the plains of Alberta, Canada, near Calgary. For its second season, the series was renamed Lonesome Dove: The Outlaw Years, and was retooled for a greater focus on action. The series was cancelled in March 1996, after two seasons, due to low ratings.

Episodes

Series overview

Lonesome Dove: The Series (1994–95)

Lonesome Dove: The Outlaw Years (1995–96)

Reception 
Todd Everett of Variety was mostly positive in his review of Lonesome Dove: The Series, praising the script by Stephen Zito and Tom Towler, and the direction by Sidney J. Furie. Chris Willman of Los Angeles Times was more mixed in his review, praising the "luscious Canadian Rocky Mountain scenery", but noting that the syndicated television series shared little in common with its predecessors and lacked "any of the solemn sophistication of the first miniseries".

References

External links 
 
 
 
 

1990s American drama television series
1994 American television series debuts
1996 American television series endings
First-run syndicated television programs in the United States
1990s Western (genre) television series